Enemy is a 2013 psychological drama film directed by Denis Villeneuve and produced by M. A. Faura and Niv Fichman. Written by Javier Gullón, it was loosely adapted from José Saramago's 2002 novel The Double. The film stars Jake Gyllenhaal in a dual role as two men who are physically identical, but different in personality. Mélanie Laurent, Sarah Gadon, and Isabella Rossellini co-star. It is an international co-production of companies from Spain, France and Canada.

Enemy premiered in the Special Presentation section at the 2013 Toronto International Film Festival on 8 September. Upon its wide release by A24 on 14 March 2014, the film earned $3.4 million at the box office and received positive reviews. Enemy earned ten nominations at the 2nd Canadian Screen Awards, winning five, including Best Director for Villeneuve, and Canadian Screen Award for Best Supporting Actress for Gadon. It was named Best Canadian Film of the Year at the Toronto Film Critics Association Awards 2014.

Plot

A man attends an erotic show at an underground club, which culminates with a naked woman on the verge of crushing a live tarantula under her platform high-heel.

Adam Bell, a college history professor, lives a quiet, monotonous life in Toronto. He rents a film, Where There's a Will There's a Way, on the recommendation of a colleague, and spots an actor who looks strikingly like himself, briefly, in the film as a bellhop. Searching online, Adam identifies the actor as Anthony Claire, whose stage name is Daniel Saint Claire. Adam rents the other two films in which Anthony has appeared and becomes obsessed with the man, who appears to be his physical twin. Immediately afterwards, Adam searches some boxes in his own house and finds a photo of someone who looks like himself, with a woman's hand over his shoulder. However, part of the photo is torn out, making the woman impossible to identify.

Adam stalks Anthony, visiting his talent agency, where he is mistaken for Anthony and given a confidential letter. Discovering Anthony's apartment in Mississauga, Adam calls the home, but reaches Anthony's pregnant wife, Helen. She also mistakes Adam's voice for Anthony's and assumes it's a joke, but Adam insists he is not Anthony. This frightens Helen, and Adam abruptly ends the call.

Adam calls again later and reaches Anthony, who assumes Adam is a stalker and tells him not to call again. Helen confronts Anthony about the phone call and Adam's existence, but Anthony insists he knows nothing. Unconvinced, Helen researches Adam, discovers the college where he teaches, and finds him. Helen is visibly stunned at his exact resemblance to her husband, though Adam does not realize who Helen is.

Anthony eventually calls Adam, and they agree to meet in a hotel room, where they discover that they are perfectly identical, even having the same scar. Adam is taken aback by Anthony's direct personality, says the meeting was a mistake, and swiftly departs. The two men begin having similar dreams, or perhaps the same dream, featuring first a naked woman with a spider's head, and later a giant skyscraper-sized spider walking amidst the buildings of the city where they live.

The next day, Anthony is now stalking Adam. He sees Adam's girlfriend, Mary, whom he finds attractive. Anthony plots to accuse Adam of sleeping with his wife, and shame and manipulate Adam into letting him sleep with Mary to 'get even'. He demands Adam's clothes and car keys for a night, after which he promises to disappear forever. Adam complies. Anthony impersonates him and takes Mary to the hotel.

Meanwhile, Adam goes to Anthony's apartment in retaliation, and is let inside. The building concierge desperately asks 'Anthony' to take him back to the underground sex club. Inside the apartment, Adam finds a framed photo on a shelf which looks like the one he had found earlier in his own house, but now the photo is intact, and the woman is revealed to be Helen. Adam tries to act as Anthony in front of Helen, but it appears that she recognizes his nicer demeanor. She pretends not to notice and cuddles with him. Later that night, however, Helen wakes to find Adam crying and apologizing; she tells him she prefers him and asks him to stay, then has sex with him.

Back at the hotel, Mary panics during sex when she notices Anthony's wedding-ring mark and asks who he really is. Anthony claims he has always had the mark. She forces Anthony to drive her home; the two get into a fight in the car which results in a high-speed crash, presumably killing them both.

The next day, Adam dresses in Anthony's clothes and finally opens the confidential letter received earlier. He finds the key to the underground sex club, given only to select members. He resolves to go there, and tells Helen that he's going out, but she doesn't respond. As he enters the bedroom, he sees, instead of Helen, a room-sized tarantula cowering against the rear wall. Adam, with a resigned look, sighs.

Cast
Jake Gyllenhaal as Adam Bell and Anthony Claire
Mélanie Laurent as Mary
Sarah Gadon as Helen Claire
Isabella Rossellini as Mother
Kedar Brown as a security guard
Darryl Dinn as the video store clerk
Joshua Peace as Carl, Adam's colleague
Tim Post as Anthony's concierge
Misha Highstead, Megan Mane, Alexis Uiga as the Ladies in the Dark Room
Jane Moffat as Eve (uncredited)
Stephen R. Hart as Bouncer (uncredited)

Production
Principal photography began on 22 May 2012 in Toronto.

Analysis
A review in Indiewire compared the film to Christopher Nolan's Memento, and called it an "engrossing Kafka-esque provocative psychological thriller" that "doesn't reveal itself easily".

Both director Villeneuve and leading actor Gyllenhaal spoke of their desire to make the film a challenging exploration of the subconscious. To Villeneuve, Enemy is ultimately about repetition:  the question of how to live and learn without repeating the same mistakes.

Regarding the two physically identical characters, Villeneuve hints: "You don't know if they are two in reality, or maybe from a subconscious point of view, there's just one. It's maybe two sides of the same persona … or a fantastic event where you see another [self]."

Gyllenhaal says that Enemy is "about a man who is married, his wife is pregnant, and he’s having an affair. He has to figure himself out before he can commit to life as an adult."

Forrest Wickman of Slate points out that the opening line of the film, "Chaos is order yet undeciphered", is from the José Saramago novel The Double, on which the film is based. Wickman suggests that Enemy is "a parable about what it's like to live under a totalitarian state without knowing it," and adds that the central irony is that even though the main character is an expert on the ways of totalitarian governments, he does not see the web that has overtaken the city until he is already stuck in it. To Wickman, Enemy suggests that this tendency to create totalitarian regimes is part of human nature, that it comes from within us, citing Villeneuve: "Sometimes you have compulsions that you can't control coming from the subconscious … they are the dictator inside ourselves."

Reception
Enemy received generally positive reviews from critics, with many critics comparing the movie's style and atmosphere to the works of David Lynch. It has a 71% approval rating on Rotten Tomatoes, based on 122 reviews, and a rating average of 6.6/10. The site's consensus states: "Thanks to a strong performance from Jake Gyllenhaal and smart direction from Denis Villeneuve, Enemy hits the mark as a tense, uncommonly adventurous thriller." The film also has a score of 61 out of 100 on Metacritic, based on 30 reviews, indicating "generally favorable reviews". Audiences surveyed by CinemaScore gave the film an average grade of "B" on an A+ to F scale.

A. O. Scott, movie critic for The New York Times, wrote: "In any case, much of the fun in "Enemy," which is tightly constructed and expertly shot, lies in Mr. Gyllenhaal's playful and subtle performances... Its style is alluring and lurid, a study in hushed tones and yellowy hues, with jolts of anxiety provided by loud, scary music." Enemy was also praised by David Ehrlich of Film.com for having "the scariest ending of any film ever made."

Enemy opened in a single theater in North America and grossed $16,161. Expanding later, the widest release for the film was 120 theaters. It ended up earning $1,008,726 domestically and $2,388,721 internationally for a total of $3,397,447.

Enemy earned ten nominations at the 2nd Canadian Screen Awards, winning five, including Best Director for Villeneuve, and Canadian Screen Award for Best Supporting Actress for Gadon.

References

External links

Enemy at Library and Archives Canada

2013 films
2013 psychological thriller films
Canadian psychological thriller films
French psychological thriller films
2010s erotic thriller films
Spanish erotic thriller films
French erotic thriller films
2010s English-language films
English-language Canadian films
English-language French films
English-language Spanish films
Erotic romance films
Films based on thriller novels
Films based on Portuguese novels
Films directed by Denis Villeneuve
Films set in Toronto
Films shot in Toronto
A24 (company) films
Films based on works by José Saramago
Canadian erotic thriller films
2010s American films
2010s Canadian films
2010s French films
2010s Spanish films
Spanish psychological thriller films